The FIBA Under-21 World Championship for Women was a women's under-21 only basketball competition organized by FIBA, first held in 2003. FIBA no longer holds world championships for this age group.

Summaries

Medal table

Participation details

References

External links
 United States history
 FIBA Archive

Under
Under-21 basketball competitions between national teams
Women's basketball competitions between national teams
World youth sports competitions
World championships in basketball